Sophie Chang and Alexandra Mueller were the defending champions, but lost in the first round to Luisa Stefani and Renata Zarazúa.

Ellen Perez and Arina Rodionova won the title, defeating Chen Pei-hsuan and Wu Fang-hsien in the final, 6–0, 6–2.

Seeds

Draw

Draw

References
Main Draw

Koser Jewelers Tennis Challenge - Doubles